Olive Young (Hangul: 올리브영) is a health and beauty product store based in South Korea. Olive Young opened its first store in Sinsa-dong, Gangnam in December 1999 under the management of CJ Systems and pioneered Korea's health and beauty market. As of 2017, it was number one within its market.  Olive Young's main slogan is "All live young with Olive Young." which reflects the main philosophy 'Natural Healthy' of Olive Young. In 2021, Olive Young is solidifying its No.1 position in the Korean H&B market, which was hit directly by Covid-19.

History 
Olive Young's first store opened in 1999 in Sinsa. In 2002, the company established a joint venture with Dairy Farm International part of the Jardine Matheson Group. The joint venture was terminated in 2008, when Olive Young acquired the entirety of CJ company shares on the market.

The company started importing organic cosmetics from Juice Beauty, a popular US cosmetics brand, in 2009. It released CJ ONE, an integrated membership service for CJ Systems, in 2010.

In December 2014, Olive Young merged with CJ Systems and changed its name to CJ Olive Networks Co., Ltd. It introduced the electronic shelf labeling system to its stores in 2018.

Olive Young launched the Global Mall in 2019 to realize a new brand message called "Global Lifestyle Platform to Propose Healthy Beauty." This can be seen as a leader in 'K-Life Style'.

Major business

Self-developed products 
 Cosmetic accessories: cotton swabs, nail clippers, hair combs
 Beauty supplies: sunscreen, mask packs, nose packs

Self-developed brands 
 Color brands: Elle girl, WAKEMAKE, Color Gram
 Skin care brands: Plant country, Bio Heal boH, Round Around, Dream Works Beauty Collection, Bring Green
 Men's skin care brands: XTM Style homme

Exclusive sales products 
Imported cosmetics: Cottage, Bull Dog, Yves Rocher, Saforelle, Rap Phyto, The Balm, Topicrem

General sales products 
 Beauty Care: skin care, makeup, perfume, men's cosmetics, beauty accessories
 Healthcare: health functional foods, health supplies, emergency supplies
 Personal care: hair and body care, oral care, hygiene
 Food: beverages, confectionery, processed foods
 Sundries: household goods, personal belongings, cultural gift certificates

Past exclusive sales products 
 Imported cosmetics: Sukin, Lanolips

References

External links
 

Retail companies of South Korea
Retail companies established in 1999
South Korean companies established in 1999